Maitane López Millán (born 13 March 1995) is a Spanish professional footballer who plays as a midfielder for Liga F club Atlético Madrid and the Spain women's national team.

Club career
In June 2015, Levante announced the signing of López from Collerense. She would spend five seasons at Levante, after which, she would sign for Real Sociedad. In July 2021, after one year at Real Sociedad, López transferred to Atlético Madrid, where she signed a two-year professional contract.

International career
After injuries to Virginia Torrecilla and Amanda Sampedro, López was called up to the Spain national team to face the Czech Republic in October 2019. She did not play in the fixture. Two years later, she made her debut for Spain in a friendly match against Morocco.

Personal life
López is of Basque descent through her father. Two of López's uncles, Aitor and Luis López Rekarte, were professional footballers. Encouraged by Aitor's performances for Real Sociedad, Maitane López signed up for her first football team at the age of five. At that same age, she had moved to Mallorca from Águilas. Outside of football, she sings and plays guitar; she has posted videos on social media of various cover songs that she has performed.

References

1995 births
Living people
Women's association football midfielders
Spanish women's footballers
People from Águilas
UD Collerense (women) players
Levante UD Femenino players
Real Sociedad (women) players
Atlético Madrid Femenino players
Primera División (women) players
Spanish people of Basque descent
Spain women's international footballers
Footballers from the Region of Murcia
Spain women's youth international footballers
21st-century Spanish women